Jenny Dawson is an Anglican priest.

She was educated at the University of Otago.  She was Archdeacon of Kapiti from 2008 until 2011 when she became Chaplain to the Bishop of Waiapu. In 2015 returned to Wellington.

References

University of Otago alumni
Archdeacons of Kapiti
Living people
Year of birth missing (living people)